Perella is a surname and may refer to:
 Joseph R. Perella (born 1941), Italian-American financier
 Marco Perella (born 1949), American actor and author

See also

 Perella Weinberg Partners, financial services firm established in 2006
 Wasserstein Perella & Co., investment bank established in 1988